Pete Mescalero, professionally known by his stage name DJ Mek, is an Irish award-winning hip hop DJ/turntablist and producer. He has won 5 Irish national Disco Mix Club championships and remixed/produced artists like Ian Brown, The Frames, Zig and Zag and Jon Carter's Monkey Mafia. In 1989, he became the first DJ from the Republic of Ireland to enter the U.K. DMC Championships, and went on to win 5 Irish national titles. He was briefly banned from entering the championships but that decision was later overturned. His group ScaryEire were the first Irish rap act to be signed to a major label. He retired from competitive mixing competitions in 2000 but returned in 2021 to place 5th in the DMC World Foundation Finals

Mixing Achievements
 1989 Northern Ireland DMC Runner-Up 
 1990 Republic of Ireland DMC Champion 
 1991 Republic of Ireland DMC Champion 
 1992 Republic of Ireland DMC Champion 
 1997 Northern Ireland DMC Champion 
 1997 Vestax UK Runner-Up
 1998 Irish D.T.F. Champion 
 1998 UK Battle Royale Runner-Up
 1999 Republic of Ireland DMC Champion
 2021 DMC World Foundation 5th place

Production & Remixes
 Monkey Mafia 12" - Blow The Whole Joint Up (Heavenly Records)
 The Frames 12" - 'Monument' (ZTT Records) -DJ Mek Remix
 Ghost and Jay - '2 Innocent/Good and Evil'
 Scary Eire 12" - 'Dole Q' (Eleven Records) 
 Planet Rap Compilation - "Lost For Words" (Tommy Boy Records)
 Third Eye Surfers - 'Sunny and Share' (DJ.Mek scratch edit)
 Exile Eye - 'Heavyweight' (Equilibrium Recordings) 
 Ian Brown - 'Cocaine in my brain' (Polydor)
 Gemma Fox - 'Messy' (Polydor) 
 Rodney P. - 'Flashbacks' (Riddim Killa)
 Ian Brown - 'F.E.A.R.' (Polydor)
 Ian Brown - 'Sister Rose' (Polydor)
 La Coka Nostra - 'Get Outta My way'
 La Coka Nostra - 'Tony Montana' featuring B-Real of Cypress Hill & Sick Jacken of Psycho Realm
 Scary Eire - 'The Scary Era' album
Replicants - 'Jiro' (DJ Mek Scratch Re-Fix) (Electro Empire)
 Madi Mai - 'Anti-Clockwise (DJ Mek Re-Fix) (Instinctive Behaviour Records)

Mixtape / C.D. releases
 Word of Mouth / Arista Records - All Shook Up - Volume 2 
 DJ Mek - Frontline - Volume 1 
 DJ Mek - Frontline - Volume 2
 DJ Mek - Frontline - Volume 3
 DJ Mek - Frontline - Volume 4
 DJ Mek - Volume 5 - D.B.B.S.

Television appearances
 Jo Maxi 
 Nighthawks (TV series)
 MTV
 The Saturday Night Show
 Zig and Zag (TV series)
 Origins: The Story Of Irish Hip Hop documentary

References

Irish DJs
Living people
Musicians from Dublin (city)
DJs from Dublin (city)
Year of birth missing (living people)
Place of birth missing (living people)
Electronic dance music DJs